Mike Möllensiep (28 November 1975 – 14 May 2019) was a German footballer.

References

1975 births
2019 deaths
German footballers
FC Schalke 04 II players
FC Schalke 04 players
VfB Lübeck players
Dynamo Dresden players
KFC Uerdingen 05 players
Sportspeople from Gelsenkirchen
Bundesliga players
Association football forwards